Giovanni Francini (born 3 August 1963) is a retired Italian footballer, who played as a defender.

Club career
During his club career Francini played for Torino (1978–87), making his debut in 1980, and during this period he was sent to Serie B side Reggiana on loan for the 1982–83 season, where he could not help the team avoid relegation to Serie C. During his time with the Turin club, he managed to reach three consecutive Coppa Italia finals between 1980–1982, also managing a second-place finish in Serie A in 1985, and he also made his European debut during his time at the club. He later played for Maradona's Napoli side (1987–1994), where he enjoyed another successful period. During this time, he won the Serie A, the Supercoppa Italiana, and the UEFA Cup, also reaching the Coppa Italia final. He moved to Genoa briefly in 1994, and subsequently to Brescia (1994–96), where he retired in 1996, at the age of 32, in Serie B.

International career
Francini represented Italy at under-21 level on 12 occasions, scoring 2 goals, and reaching the final of the 1986 UEFA Under-21 European Championships under manager Cesare Maldini. He earned 8 senior caps for the Italy national football team under manager Azeglio Vicini between 1986–90, and took part in the 1988 UEFA European Football Championship, where the Italians reached the semi-final of the tournament. Throughout his career, he received limited playing time for Italy, due to the presence of Antonio Cabrini, and later, Paolo Maldini in his role.

Style of play
Francini primarily played as a left-sided fullback, where he excelled due to his pace, stamina, consistency, composure, and work-rate. He was also capable of playing as a man-marking centre-back, known as a "stopper," in Italian football jargon. Despite being known as a tenacious and hard-tackling defender, he was also known for his offensive capabilities as a full-back, due to his technique and crossing accuracy, as well as eye for goal, courtesy of his heading, ability to cut inside and shoot on goal with his stronger left foot, and his ability to make attacking runs into the penalty area. He also stood out for his leadership throughout his career.

Honours
Napoli
Serie A: 1989–90
Supercoppa Italiana: 1990
UEFA Cup: 1988–89

References

External links

1963 births
Living people
Italian footballers
Italy under-21 international footballers
Italy international footballers
UEFA Euro 1988 players
Serie A players
Serie B players
Torino F.C. players
A.C. Reggiana 1919 players
S.S.C. Napoli players
Genoa C.F.C. players
Brescia Calcio players
UEFA Cup winning players
Association football defenders